Atsuro Riley is an American writer.

Riley is the author of the poetry collections Heard-Hoard (University of Chicago Press, 2021) and Romey's Order (University of Chicago Press, 2010).

In 2023, his work received the Arts and Letters Award in Literature from the American Academy of Arts and Letters.

Heard-Hoard was the winner of the Alice Fay di Castagnola Award from the Poetry Society of America and a finalist for the PEN/Voelcker Poetry Award; it was named a 'Best Book of 2021' by The Boston Globe and a 'Top 10 Book of 2021' by Bookworm.  Romey's Order received the Whiting Award, the Kate Tufts Discovery Award, The Believer Poetry Award,  and the Witter Bynner Award from the Library of Congress.  Riley's work has been awarded the Lannan Foundation Literary Fellowship, the Pushcart Prize, the Wood Prize from Poetry magazine, and a National Endowment for the Arts Literature Fellowship.

Poems appear in A Public Space, Poetry (magazine), The Kenyon Review,  McSweeney's, The Believer, The Threepenny Review, The New Republic, Free Verse Journal, Riddle Fence (Canada), Southern Cultures, The Poetry Review (UK),  Poetry International.

Riley's poetry has been anthologized in The Mind Has Cliffs of Fall: Poems at the Extremes of Feeling, ed. Robert Pinsky  (W.W. Norton), The Open Door: One Hundred Poems, One Hundred Years of Poetry Magazine, Poems of the American South  (Everyman's Library-Knopf),The Oxford Anthology of  Contemporary American Poetry (Oxford University Press), The McSweeney's Book of Poets Picking Poets  (McSweeney's),  Poems From Far and Wide (McSweeney's), Vinegar and Char (University of Georgia Press), Gracious (Texas Tech University Press), Home: 100 Poems (Yale University Press).

Brought up in the South Carolina lowcountry, Atsuro Riley lives in San Francisco.   
 
He is the editor of Revel, a literary journal.

Awards
 Arts and Letters Award in Literature, American Academy of Arts and Letters
 Alice Fay di Castagnola Award, Poetry Society of America
 PEN/Voelcker Award for Poetry (finalist), PEN America
 Whiting Award
 Kate Tufts Discovery Award
 The Believer Poetry Award
 Lannan Literary Fellowship, Lannan Foundation
 Witter Bynner Fellowship, Library of Congress
 Pushcart Prize
 J. Howard and Barbara M.J. Wood Prize, Poetry 
 National Endowment for the Arts Literature Fellowship

Works

Anthologies & Critical Volumes
The Oxford Anthology of  Contemporary American Poetry (Oxford University Press)
The Open Door: One Hundred Poems, One Hundred Years of Poetry Magazine (University of Chicago Press)
The Mind Has Cliffs of Fall: Poems at the Extremes of Feeling— ed. Robert Pinsky  (W.W. Norton)
Poems of the American South  (Everyman's Library-Knopf)
The McSweeney's Book of Poets Picking Poets  (McSweeney's)
Poems From Far and Wide  (McSweeney's) 
Vinegar and Char  (University of Georgia Press)
Radical as Reality: Form and Freedom in American Poetry— by Peter Campion  (University of Chicago Press)
The Fate of Difficulty in the Poetry of Our Time— ed. Charles Altieri & Nicholas Nace  (Northwestern University Press)
Gracious: Poems from the 21st Century South— ed. John Poch  (Texas Tech University Press)
Home: 100 Poems— ed. Christian Wiman  (Yale University Press)

Reviews/Interviews

HEARD-HOARD

ROMEY'S ORDER

References

External links
author's website—www.atsuroriley.org
at The Shipman Agency website
  The PEN/Voelcker Award: 'a distinguished poetry collection that expands the scope of American poetry'
  Poetry International (Rotterdam) critical commentary + poems
  Flavorwire: 50 Best American Poetry Books of the Decade So Far
The Whiting Foundation
 Alice Fay di Castagnola Award: Poetry Society of America

Living people
Writers from South Carolina
Poets from South Carolina
American male poets
Year of birth missing (living people)